Schwarzwald-Baar-Center is a large mall in Villingen-Schwenningen, Germany.  It has a striking architecture as its roof is carried by an inclined tower with its name and which is also equipped with a flight safety lamp.  Schwarzwald-Baar-Center was opened on September 28, 2000 and houses 35 stores.

Towers completed in 2000
Inclined towers
Shopping malls established in 2000
Buildings and structures in Schwarzwald-Baar-Kreis
Shopping malls in Germany
Villingen-Schwenningen